This is a list of historical events and publications of Australian literature during 2019.

Major publications

Literary fiction
 Debra Adelaide, Zebra and other stories
Tony Birch, The White Girl
David Brooks, The Grass Library
Steven Carroll, The Year of the Beast
Melanie Cheng, Room for a Stranger
Peggy Frew, Islands
Peter Goldsworthy, Minotaur
John Hughes, No One
Anna Krien, Act of Grace
Vicki Laveau-Harvie, The Erratics
Melina Marchetta, The Place on Dalhousie
Andrew McGahan, The Rich Man's House (posthumous)
Gerald Murnane, A Season on Earth
Favel Parrett, There Was Still Love
Heather Rose, Bruny
Philip Slalom, The Returns
Carrie Tiffany, Exploded View
Lucy Treloar, Wolfe Island
Christos Tsiolkas, Damascus
Tara June Winch, The Yield
Charlotte Wood, The Weekend

Short stories 

 Josephine Rowe, Here Until August

Children's and young adult fiction
 Mem Fox, The Tiny Star
 Helena Fox, How It Feels to Float
Will Kostakis, Monuments
Meg McKinlay, Catch a Falling Star
Bruce Pascoe, Young Dark Emu
Holden Sheppard, Invisible Boys
Vikki Wakefield, This is How We Change the Ending

Crime
 Matthew Condon, The Night Dragon
 Candice Fox, Gone By Midnight
Tara Moss, Dead Man Switch

Science fiction 

Claire G. Coleman, The Old Lie

Poetry
Louise Crisp, Yuiquimbiang
Charmaine Papertalk Green, Nganajungu Yagu
L. K. Holt, Birth Plan
Gerald Murnane, Green Shadows and Other Poems
Pi O, Heide

Non-fiction
 Jane Caro, Accidental Feminists
 Maxine Beneba Clarke, with Magan Magan and Ahmed Yussuf (editors), Growing Up African in Australia
 Stan Grant
 Australia Day
 On Identity
Nicholas Hasluck, Beyond the Equator: An Australian Memoir
Jess Hill, See What You Made Me Do
Jacqueline Kent, Beyond Words: A Year with Kenneth Cook
Caro Llewellyn, Diving into Glass
Emily Maguire, This is What a Feminist Looks Like
Bianca Nogrady (editor), The Best Australian Science Writing 2019
Christina Thompson, Sea People: The Puzzle of Polynesia

Awards and honours

Note: these awards were presented in the year in question.

Lifetime achievement

Fiction

National

Children and Young Adult

National

Crime and Mystery

National

Science Fiction

Non-Fiction

Poetry

Drama

Deaths

 20 January – Mudrooroo, 80, novelist, poet and playwright (pen name of Colin Thomas Johnson)
1 February – Andrew McGahan, 52, novelist
 4 March – Les Carlyon, 76, newspaper editor
 13 March – Edmund Capon, 78, art historian
 15 March – Rudi Krausmann, 85, playwright and poet
 22 March – Jack Absalom, 91, artist, author and adventurer
 29 April – Les Murray, 80, poet, anthologist and critic
 19 May – John Millett, 98, poet, reviewer and poetry editor
 1 June – Christobel Mattingley, 87, writer for children and young adults
 13 July  – Kerry Reed-Gilbert, 62, poet and author
 21 July – 
Laurie Hergenhan, 88, literary scholar
Ann Moyal, 93, historian
 10 September – Hal Colebatch, 73, poet and novelist
30 October – Beatrice Faust, 80, co-founder of Women's Electoral Lobby, journalist and author
24 November – Clive James, 80, poet, novelist and critic

See also
 Literature
 List of years in Australian literature
 List of Australian literary awards

References

Literature
Australian literature by year
Years of the 21st century in Australia
Years of the 21st century in literature